The Newell Toll Bridge is a privately owned suspension bridge over the Ohio River on the Golding Street Extension between Newell, West Virginia and East Liverpool, Ohio, United States.  It carries two lanes of roadway and a pedestrian path along the west side.  Tolls are charged for all road users at varying rates depending upon vehicle; pedestrians are also tolled. The bridge is one of the last suspension bridges on the Ohio River.

References

See also
 List of crossings of the Ohio River

Road bridges in West Virginia
Road bridges in Ohio
Toll bridges in Ohio
Toll bridges in West Virginia
Suspension bridges in the United States
1905 establishments in West Virginia
1905 establishments in Ohio
Bridges completed in 1905